Momolu Dukuly (1903 – 1980) was a politician in Liberia. He was the second foreign minister under William V.S. Tubman (Dukuly replaced Gabriel Lafayette Dennis, who died in office in 1954). Dukuly was the first "Native" Liberian to be appointed foreign minister. Dukuly was of Mandingo descent. He was a Muslim in his early life. He, however, left Islam and embraced Christianity before he became foreign minister. He was preceded by Gabriel Lafayette Dennis and was succeeded by J. Rudolph Grimes.

References

External links
Photo

1903 births
1980 deaths
Foreign Ministers of Liberia
Liberian Christians
Converts to Protestantism from Islam
Liberian former Muslims
Grand Crosses 1st class of the Order of Merit of the Federal Republic of Germany